Butyrka is a rural locality (a selo) in Klenovskoye Rural Settlement, Zhirnovsky District, Volgograd Oblast, Russia. The population was 327 as of 2010. There are 5 streets.

Geography 
Butyrka is located on Khopyorsko-Buzulukskaya Plain, on the left bank of the Shchelkan River, 38 km northwest of Zhirnovsk (the district's administrative centre) by road. Lemeshkino is the nearest rural locality.

References 

Rural localities in Zhirnovsky District